Northwind Calling is a folk album by Alaskan singer-songwriter Mossy Kilcher. Initially released as a private press album in 1977, the album was not a commercial success but gained a cult following. It gained renewed attention when it was reissued in 2020 by Tompkins Square Records.

Track listing

References 

1977 albums